Roshanabad or Rashanabad may refer to:
 Roshanabad, Kohgiluyeh and Boyer-Ahmad
 Roshanabad, South Khorasan
 Roshanabad Rural District, in Golestan Province

See also
 Rowshanabad (disambiguation)
 Rushanabad